Wollaston Fire Station is a historic fire station at 111 Beale Street in Quincy, Massachusetts.  The two-story brick building was built in 1900 on the site of an earlier wooden fire station, and is a fine local example of Italianate design.  The tower, which dominates the structure, has a low-pitch tile roof over a corbelled eave, and an arched arcade.  Its original arched bay entries have lost their original arched openings in order to accommodate large pieces of equipment.

The building was listed on the National Register of Historic Places in 1989.

See also
National Register of Historic Places listings in Quincy, Massachusetts

References

Buildings and structures in Quincy, Massachusetts
Fire stations on the National Register of Historic Places in Massachusetts
Italianate architecture in Massachusetts
Fire stations completed in 1900
National Register of Historic Places in Quincy, Massachusetts